Organisms Diversity & Evolution is a quarterly peer-reviewed scientific journal covering various aspects of biodiversity and evolution of organisms. It is published by Springer Science+Business Media on behalf of the Gesellschaft für Biologische Systematik and was established in 2001. The editor-in-chief is  Andreas Wanninger (University of Vienna).

The journal publishes research articles, reviews, and commentaries related to phylogenetics, taxonomy, comparative morphology, molecular evolution, biogeography, and conservation biology.

Abstracting and indexing
The journal is abstracted and indexed in:

According to the Journal Citation Reports, the journal has a 2021 impact factor of 2.663.

References

External links

English-language journals
Springer Science+Business Media academic journals
Publications established in 2001
Biology journals
Quarterly journals